Derik Gean Severino Lacerda (born 27 September 1999), known as Derik, is a Brazilian footballer who plays for Spanish club Ponferradina.

Club career
On 8 August 2020, he signed for Primeira Liga side Moreirense.

On 31 July 2022, Derik moved to Spanish Segunda División club SD Ponferradina.

Career statistics

Club

Notes

References

External links

1999 births
People from Duque de Caxias, Rio de Janeiro
Sportspeople from Rio de Janeiro (state)
Living people
Brazilian footballers
Association football forwards
Associação Académica de Coimbra – O.A.F. players
Moreirense F.C. players
SD Ponferradina players
Primeira Liga players
Liga Portugal 2 players
Brazilian expatriate footballers
Expatriate footballers in Portugal
Expatriate footballers in Spain
Brazilian expatriate sportspeople in Portugal
Brazilian expatriate sportspeople in Spain